Servicios Aeronáuticos de Oriente SA de CV (abbreviated as SAOSA) was a Mexican charter airline.

History
The airline was formed in 1995 as result of deregulation in Mexico and started charter operations in October of that year. The airline started flights to the U.S. in August 1997. The airline filed for bankruptcy in May 2002, but the bankruptcy was declared invalid two months later; however the airline never resumed operations due to the lack of investments, personnel, and infrastructure. Aeromexico attempted to buy and rescue the airline in April 2003, but soon abandoned this plan.

Fleet
2 Cessna Citation 650

Destinations

Mexico
 Acapulco
 Cancun
 Mexico City
 Monterrey
 Toluca

References

External links
Defunct airlines - Mexico

Defunct airlines of Mexico
Airlines established in 1995
Airlines disestablished in 2002
Mexican companies established in 1995
2002 disestablishments in Mexico